Symmoca cinerariella is a moth of the family Autostichidae. It is found in Italy and on Sicily, Corsica and Sardinia.

The forewings are dull ash grey with fine dark sprinkling. The hindwings are also ash grey.

References

Moths described in 1859
Symmoca
Moths of Europe